Cyrtodactylus muangfuangensis, the Muangfuang bent-toed gecko, is a species of gecko endemic to central Laos.

References

Cyrtodactylus
Reptiles described in 2019